Esben is a Norwegian and Danish male given name.

Origin and variants
It originated as a variant of Asbjørn. A common variant is Espen

Notable people
Notable people with this name include:
 Esben Esther Pirelli Benestad, Norwegian physician and sexologist 
 Esben Hansen, Danish football midfielder
 Esben Storm, Danish-Australian actor

References

Danish masculine given names
Norwegian masculine given names
Masculine given names